Ted: För kärlekens skull (English ), also known as Ted: Show Me Love, is a 2018 Swedish film directed and written by Hannes Holm and produced by Lena Rehnberg. Starring Adam Pålsson and Peter Viitanen as Ted and Kenneth Gärdestad, respectively, the film is loosely based on the life of Ted Gärdestad, who was one of Sweden's best-known pop artists in the 1970s, and that of his brother Kenneth, who wrote the lyrics for Ted's songs but did not share his fame.

The film was released on 3 January 2018 in Sweden by Stella Nova Film. It includes a number of Ted and Kenneth Gärdestad's songs, performed by Adam Pålsson.

Plot
In 1971, 15-year-old Ted Gärdestad is playing Björn Borg in the finals of the Swedish tennis championships. He notices Borg's girlfriend Helena Anliot in the audience, and his concentration is disrupted by a sudden inspiration for a song about her. He loses the game, to his father Arne's displeasure. Ted is further inspired by meeting a girl in his school library, who is studying a book about the universe; this leads to Ted and his brother Kenneth writing and recording the songs "Universum" and "Snurra du min värld" and bringing them to the record company Sweden Music in Stockholm. Here they meet Benny Andersson and Stikkan Anderson; Ted pretends that he has left the taped recording at home and starts to play "Jag vill ha en egen måne", catching the interest of the two Anderssons and leading to a contract. Arne has meanwhile tried to get Ted tennis lessons with Björn Borg's coach, and is upset when Ted misses his first coaching session.

During the recording of Ted's debut album "Undringar", with singers Anni-Frid Lyngstad and Agnetha Fältskog and session guitarist Janne Schaffer, Stikkan Andersson tells Kenneth that he cannot keep writing the lyrics for Ted's songs. Ted however refuses to work with any other lyricist, and states that Kenneth is the only person who can express how Ted is feeling. Andersson is more successful in his attempts to persuade Ted to give up his tennis career, saying that he cannot be a singer and a tennis player at the same time. Ted's mother Margit is very supportive of her son's music career, and his father Arne eventually accepts his choice of music over tennis. A period follows when Ted is alternately touring folkparks around Sweden and recording new music.

In 1972, the 16-year-old has a performance at Liseberg where he is mobbed by the enthusiastic audience, finally having to escape through a window with the help of two police officers. Following this ordeal, Ted starts to experience symptoms of schizophrenia, in the form of hallucinations of an intimidating figure dressed in black who tells him not to trust anybody.

Ted becomes one of Sweden's best-known pop singers. He is involved with a number of girls, but after meeting Lotta Ramel at a party and discussing music with her father Povel he starts a longer-term relationship with her, and they eventually get married. He is scheduled for an international tour with ABBA, but chooses to stay with Lotta. She, however, meets another man, a fellow student at the School of the Arts in Malmö, and ends their relationship.

In 1979, Ted composes "Satellit" and wins the 1979 Melodifestivalen contest, which makes him the Swedish representative at the 1979 Eurovision Song Contest in Jerusalem. As he is preparing to go on stage, he suffers a breakdown and starts hearing voices, but after taking a strong dose of Valium he gets on the stage, albeit with a lacklustre performance that yields very few points. At his hotel room after the contest, he suffers new hallucinations.

In the following years, Ted searches for calm and a sense of identity, and he is introduced to the Rajneesh movement. He starts to distance himself from his family in various ways, choosing to perform lyrics written by Finn Kalvik over those created by Kenneth, which causes Kenneth to punch Kalvik in the face in frustration. Ted also begins a new relationship, with actress Ann Zacharias, and has a daughter with her. At the same time he gradually becomes more and more involved with the Rajneesh movement and gives large sums of money to them. Not long before his second child with Zacharias is due, Ted leaves her and moves to Rajneeshpuram in Oregon.

Ted returns from Oregon in 1986. His parents, together with Kenneth and his family, welcome him back but are embarrassed by his obsessive cleanliness and germophobia. In the basement of their parents' home, Kenneth tries to talk to Ted about music and family, saying that Ann Zacharias would welcome getting in touch and that Ted might try to play just for the fun of it, but he is attacked by an enraged Ted who accuses Kenneth of siding with the demons tormenting him.

Ted continues to struggle with his mental health problems, making Kenneth increasingly worried. After an episode where Ted destroys a framed publicity photo and his guitar, Kenneth manages to comfort him and Ted suddenly realises that the intimidating man in his hallucinations does not actually exist. He tells Kenneth that he wants him to write lyrics for him again, repeating his statement from the beginning of the film that Kenneth is the only lyricist who can express Ted's feelings. Kenneth writes the Swedish lyrics for "Blue Virgin Isles", and at an outdoor concert in Stockholm, Ted publicly acknowledges Kenneth's support, and performs the song in front of an audience where Ann Zacharias and his two children can be seen, together with Ted's parents and other people who have been important to him.

The final scene of the film takes place at Midsummer 1997, and hints at Ted Gärdestad's suicide, showing him hallucinating about the girl from the school library and walking towards a light background while his family, unknowing, celebrates Midsummer together.

Cast
Adam Pålsson as Ted Gärdestad
Peter Viitanen as Kenneth Gärdestad
Maria Kulle as Margit Gärdestad
Johan Hedenberg as Arne Gärdestad
Jonas Karlsson as Stikkan Anderson
Tove Edfeldt as Kicki Gärdestad
Happy Jankell as Lotta Ramel
Lotta Ramel as Susanna Ramel
Dan Johansson as Povel Ramel
Hanna Alström as Ann Zacharias
Gustav Orvefors as Janne Schaffer
Edvin Bredefeldt as Benny Andersson
Jonas Bane as Björn Ulvaeus
Amanda Gylling as Agnetha Fältskog
Angelina Håkansson as Anni-Frid Lyngstad
Kristoffer Veiersted as Finn Kalvik
Sajid Malik as Bhagwan Shree Rajneesh
Ludvig Lindblom as Björn Borg
Mikaela Ardai Jennefors as Helena Anliot
Niklas Strömstedt as Bo Strömstedt

Production
Principal photography began in February 2017 at various locations; Stockholm, Gothenburg, and Trollhättan. Additional filming was done on Tanumshede, a Swedish town that depicts Oregon, United States, in the film. The budget was reportedly to be 43 million Swedish kronor (5 million USD).

Soundtrack

On 5 January 2018, the music for the film was released on an album, "Ted - För kärlekens skull (Musiken från filmen)", with Ted Gärdestad's songs being covered by Adam Pålsson.

Track listing

Notes

References

External links

2018 films
2010s musical drama films
2018 biographical drama films
Swedish biographical drama films
Musical films based on actual events
Films directed by Hannes Holm
Films set in the 1970s
Films set in the 1980s
Films set in the 1990s
Biographical films about musicians
Biographical films about singers
Cultural depictions of Swedish men
Cultural depictions of Björn Borg
Fictional portrayals of schizophrenia
2018 drama films
2010s Swedish films